The 2021 Men's Junior Pan American Championship was the 12th edition of the Men's Pan American Junior Championship, the men's international under-21 field hockey championship of the Americas organized by the Pan American Hockey Federation.

The tournament was held alongside the women's tournament at the Prince of Wales Country Club in Santiago, Chile and was originally scheduled to take place from 30 November to 13 December 2020. On 29 May 2020 the Pan American Hockey Federation announced that the tournament was rescheduled and would take place from 12 to 25 April 2021. Later on 15 January, it was announced that the competition would take place from 21 to 28 August 2021.

Argentina were the defending champions, winning the 2016 edition. This tournament served as the Pan American qualifier for the 2021 FIH Junior World Cup, with the finalists qualifying.

Preliminary round

Pool A

Pool B

Classification round

Fifth to seventh place classification

Seventh place game

Fifth place game

First to fourth place classification

Semi-finals

Third place game

Final

Statistics

Final standings

Awards
The following awards were given at the conclusion of the tournament.

Goalscorers

See also
 2021 Women's Junior Pan American Championship

References

Pan American Junior Championship
Pan American Junior Championship
International field hockey competitions hosted by Chile
Pan American Junior Championship
Pan American Junior Championship
Sports competitions in Santiago
2020s in Santiago, Chile
Pan-Am Junior Championship
Pan American Championship